Christoph Carl Adolf Hehl (11 October 1847 – 18 June 1911) was a German architect and academic teacher who focused on church buildings. He was professor of medieval architecture at the Technische Hochschule in Berlin.

Life and career 

Born in Kassel, Hehl was the son of the inspector of the Höhere Gewerbeschule there, Johannes Hehl (1800–1884). His brother was Maximilian Emil Hehl. He attended the Gewerbeschule from 1862 to 1866, focused on building (Bauwesen). Among his teachers were Georg Gottlob Ungewitter and Paul Zindel. After military service, he studied in England. When he returned, he worked in the architect's office of Edwin Oppler in Hanover, who had been a student of Conrad Wilhelm Hase and Eugène Viollet-le-Duc. Hase's work influenced him, but reports that Hehl had studied with him at the Polytechnikum have remained unsubstantiated.

In 1872, founded his own architectural firm in Hanover. He was appointed professor of medieval architecture (mittelalterliche Baukunst) at the Technische Hochschule in Berlin-Charlottenburg, holding the post until 1910. His design are mostly in Romanesque revival style.

Hehl died in Charlottenburg on 18 June 1911 at age 63. Kühn completed projects that were unfinished then, and has been regarded as his successor as church architect.

Works 

Works by Hehl include:

 1873–1874: , Hanover-Linden

 1880: Residence for Adalbert Grüter, Bünde

 1883–1884: 
 1883–1884: 

 1889–1892:  (in Weserrenaissance style)

 1892–1893: St. Bernward, Hanover-Döhren
 1894–1895: , Hanover

 1899–1900: Rosenkranz-Basilika, Berlin-Steglitz

 1912 (completed): Mater Dolorosa, Berlin-Lankwitz (completed by Kühn)

Further reading 
 
 : Die Sakralbauten von Christoph Hehl. In: Niederdeutsche Beiträge zur Kunstgeschichte, vol. 8. 1969, pp. 211–264;.
 Behrens, Helmut: Die Profanbauten von Christoph Hehl. Eine Studie zur Architektur der hannoverschen Schule. Kiel 1978.
 : Kirchen für die Diaspora. Christoph Hehls Berliner Bauten und Hochschultätigkeit 1894–1911. (dissertation) Berlin 1993.
 Giersbeck, Andrea: Christoph Hehl (1847–1911). Ein Kirchenbaumeister zwischen Dogmatismus und Emanzipation. Schnell & Steiner, Regensburg 2012, . (= Quellen und Studien zur Geschichte und Kunst im Bistum Hildesheim, vol. 5; also dissertation, Kunsthistorisches Seminar der Universität Basel, 2009).

References 

Architects from Hanover
Architects from Berlin
Academic staff of the Technical University of Berlin
Historicist architects
1847 births
1911 deaths